Kid Monk Baroni is a 1952 American film noir sport film directed by Harold D. Schuster. It is also known as Young Paul Baroni in the United Kingdom. It features Leonard Nimoy, later in Star Trek as Spock, in his first lead role in a motion picture, as well as future Jimmy Olsen Jack Larson of television's original Adventures of Superman series.

This film was the first in producer Jack Broder's series of "The Billy Goat Gang" -  the movie's opening titles are The Billy Goat Gang in Kid Monk Baroni - similar to other gang films series like The Bowery Boys and its antecedents. However, no further films were made.

Plot
A disfigured street kid (Leonard Nimoy), a member of the Billy Goat Gang, is shown how to box by a parish priest, Father Callahan (Richard Rober), who also makes him part of the church choir. The priest introduces him to Emily. During a fight with the other members of the Billy Goats for ridiculing his church vestments, he accidentally knocks out Father Callahan, and runs away from home to avoid the repercussions. He enters amateur bouts, and then goes for plastic surgery to correct his disfigurement. After the surgery, Monk becomes even more conceited, losing the respect of Angelo and Emily, and his manager convinces him to resume fighting to address his unpaid bills.

During the comeback fight, Monk drops his dirty tactics and his opponent wins by split decision. With money going out due to Monk’s new clean tactics, his syndicate plans recoup their losses by forcing his return to dirty fighting.

In the next fight after Monk’s reform, Father Callahan and Emily are in the audience for his match against the Wildcat, which Monk loses to TKO in round 6, costing the syndicate $20,000.

Father Callahan congratulates Monk on his new ethics, and Monk and Emily reunite and marry to further Father Callahan’s sports initiative.

Cast

Leonard Nimoy as Paul "Monk" Baroni
Richard Rober as Father Callahan
Bruce Cabot as Mr. Hellman
Allene Roberts as Emily Brooks
Mona Knox as June Travers
Kathleen Freeman as Maria Baroni
Joseph Mell as Gino Baroni
Paul Maxey as Mr. Al Petry
Stuart Randall as Mr. Moore
Madelynn Broder as Little Girl in Church

the Billy Goat Gang:
Jack Larson as Angelo
Budd Jaxon as Knuckles
Chad Mallory as Tony
Ted Avery as Joey
Archer MacDonald as Pete

External links 

1952 films
1950s sports drama films
American sports drama films
1950s English-language films
American black-and-white films
American boxing films
Films directed by Harold D. Schuster
Films scored by Herschel Burke Gilbert
Jack Broder Productions Inc. films
1952 drama films
1950s American films